Zelfana is a district of Ghardaïa Province, Algeria. It was named after its capital, Zelfana.

Municipalities

The district contains only one municipality:
Zelfana

References

Districts of Ghardaïa Province